Tim Fargo is an American author, keynote speaker, angel investor and entrepreneur. He is the author of Alphabet Success and Claimants and Lies and Videotape - A Claim's Handler's Guide to Surveillance. Fargo is best known for co-founding insurance fraud investigative company, Omega Insurance Service in 1996, that became the second biggest insurance fraud investigative company in the United States, acquired by First Advantage in 2003 for $20 million. He currently serves as the President of Hammerfest Corp and writes for The Los Angeles Times, St. Petersburg Times, Business Insurance, Claims Journal and  Claims magazine on the insurance sector.

Career
Fargo earned an MBA in finance from the University of Miami School of Business. He started an event management company, Fargo Events in late 80's. In 1996 Fargo with his partner co-founded Omega Insurance Services company from his home. The company has grown from three operation to over 300 employees within five years became the second biggest insurance fraud investigative company in the United States. Omega Insurance service was listed in Inc. magazine's Top 500 Fastest Growing Companies during 2002 and 2003. In 2003, Omega insurance services was acquired by First Advantage Corporation for $20 million and rebranded it to First Advantage Investigative Services, in which Fargo served as President for one year. He has spoken on investigative techniques and acted as a moderator at insurance conferences in 2001. He is an adviser and investor in the insurance start-ups and early-stage companies. In 2015, Tim launched a new start up called Tweet Jukebox, a Twitter application and service designed to assist with scheduling tweets which has garnered attention from Forbes, Inc and Social Media Examiner.

Books
Fargo has authored two books, the first book Alphabet Success was published in 2013 distilled the lessons of his journey from bankruptcy in 1991 to the founding and growth of Omega Insurance Services. The book focus on the key aspects of his past that drove him and the business towards the goals. Fargo's second book Claimants. Lies and Videotape - A Claim's Handler's Guide to Surveillance, was focused on the proper use of examination and techniques in detecting and documenting insurance fraud.

References

External links
 Official website

Living people
American businesspeople in insurance
University of Miami Business School alumni
Year of birth missing (living people)